Old Jaffa ( [yafa ha'atiká] – Ancient Yafo;  [yafa al.ʿatīqa] – Ancient Jaffa or  [yafa al.qadīma] – Old Jaffa ) is a neighborhood of Tel Aviv-Yafo, Israel and the oldest part of Jaffa. A neighborhood with art galleries, restaurants, theaters, museums, and nightclubs, it is one of Tel Aviv's main tourist attractions.

Jaffa is the southwest district of the Tel Aviv–Jaffa municipality.
Old Jaffa is located in the northwest of Jaffa, on a hill along the Mediterranean Sea. Geologically, the hill of Old Jaffa is the continental north end of a kurkar ridge, historically further protected through fortifications and heightened by debris.

History

Ottoman Empire
The Old City was damaged by the Napoleonic wars and an earthquake in 1837. When the wall of Jaffa was dismantled between 1878 and 1888 to allow expansion, both the city and the centres of government shifted eastwards, though the Old City remained the cultural centre of the city. 

During the nineteenth century, the Christian population, especially the Greek Orthodox community, grew rapidly and dramatically in the Old Jaffa, and they formed the wealthy elite and the educated class in the city, and emerged as a major force in the increasingly middle-class trade of journalism.

British Mandate
During the Great Revolt in 1936–1939, the connection between Tel Aviv and the Jaffa port was partially severed by disruption in the Old City. This had two primary effects: the British retaliated using massive gelignite charges to destroy at least 220 buildings, which left over 6000 Arabs homeless, and encouraged the building of a small Jewish port on the Yarkon estuary to the north of Tel Aviv to reduce reliance on Arab Jaffa.

Israel
Disputes about the merging of Tel Aviv and Jaffa, with the former wanting only to add the Jewish neighborhoods in the north of Jaffa and the latter wanting a total merge led to a gradual unification. The Old City was partly added on 18 May 1949 as part of the first Arab-controlled land to fall under Jewish control. The remainder of the Old City would be added in 24 April 1950 when the complete unification occurred.

Old Jaffa has increasingly gentrified with the residential population dropping dramatically and an increasing number of art galleries, restaurants, souvenir shops as well as various ongoing archaeological digs. According to Historian Menachem Klein, 70% of structures in old Jaffa have been destroyed between 1960 and 1985, with much of the old city being covered by Pisga Park. There is a particular interest on the cultural melange by the relatively rare, in Israel, triple mix of Muslim, Jews, and Christian.

Boundaries

Current boundaries of the "Old Jaffa and Jaffa Port" neighborhood, as defined by the Municipality of Tel Aviv-Yafo (clockwise):
 North: north and east of Jaffa Beach, Retzif HaAliya HaShniya 
 East: northbound lanes of David Raziel (putting the Jaffa Clock Tower in Old Jaffa), Yefet Street
 South: Yehuda HaYamit, Namal Yafo Street, the southern wall of the Jaffa Port parking lot
 West: the Mediterranean Sea shore

Attractions

 Subregions: Jaffa Port in the west and Yefet Street on its eastern border
 Museums, galleries and studios: Farkash Gallery, Uri Geller Museum, Ilana Goor Museum, watchmaker Itay Noy, Ilan Adar
 Places of worship: Al-Bahr Mosque, Libyan Synagogue, Mahmoudiya Mosque, Saint Nicholas Monastery, St. Peter's Church
 Theaters: The Arab-Hebrew Theater, Hasimta Theater, Nalaga'at
 Towers: Jaffa Clock Tower, Jaffa Light

Immediately outside Old Jaffa: Abouelafia Bakery, Abu Hassan Restaurant

References

 
Neighborhoods of Tel Aviv
4th-century BC establishments
Ancient cities of the Middle East
Arab localities in Israel
Arab Christian communities in Israel
Jaffa